The Minister of Environment and Climate (formerly the Minister of Environment, Climate and Parks Minister of Sustainable Development and Conservation and Climate) is the member of the Executive Council of Manitoba who oversees the Department of Environment and Climate, which is responsible for issues related to Manitoba's environment and biodiversity of natural resources (e.g., water, wildlife, and forests).

The current Environnement and Climate Minister is  Kevin Klein and the Deputy Minister is Jan Forster.

List of Ministers

Acts and regulations 
Current acts and regulations under the Continuing Consolidation of the Statutes of Manitoba (CCSM) for which the Minister of Conservation and Climate is responsible for include:

 Biofuels Act, SM 2003, c. 5
 Conservation Agreements Act, SM 1997, c. 59
 Conservation Officers Act, SM 2015, c. 4
 Contaminated Sites Remediation Act, SM 1996, c. 40
 Crown Corporations Governance and Accountability Act, SM 2017, c. 19 [only as it relates to Efficiency Manitoba]
 Dangerous Goods Handling and Transportation Act, RSM 1987, c. D12
 Drinking Water Safety Act, SM 2002, c. 36
 East Side Traditional Lands Planning and Special Protected Areas Act, SM 2009, c. 7
 Ecological Reserves Act, RSM 1987, c. E5
 Efficiency Manitoba Act, SM 2017, c. 18
 Energy Act, SM 1994, c. 3
 Environment Act, SM 1987-88, c. 26
 Gas Pipe Line Act, RSM 1987, c. G50
 Groundwater and Water Well Act, SM 2012, c. 27
 Ozone Depleting Substances Act, SM 1989-90, c. 38
 Provincial Parks Act, SM 1993, c. 39
 Polar Bear Protection Act, SM 2002, c. 25
 Resource Tourism Operators Act, SM 2002, c. 46
 Waste Reduction and Prevention Act, SM 1989-90, c. 60
 Water Power Act, RSM 1987, c. W60
 Water Protection Act, SM 2005, c. 26
 Water Resources Conservation Act, SM 2000, c. 11
 Water Rights Act, RSM 1988, c. W80
 Wildfires Act, SM 1997, c. 36

References

External links
 Government of Manitoba: Manitoba Conservation

Conservation, Minister of